The 1964 Bexley Council election took place on 7 May 1964 to elect members of Bexley London Borough Council in London, England. The whole council was up for election and the Labour party gained control of the council.

Background
These elections were the first to the newly formed borough. Previously elections had taken place in the Municipal Borough of Bexley, Municipal Borough of Erith, Chislehurst and Sidcup Urban District and Crayford Urban District. These boroughs and districts were joined to form the new London Borough of Bexley by the London Government Act 1963.

A total of 157 candidates stood in the election for the 56 seats being contested across 20 wards. These included a full slate from the Labour party, while the Conservative and Liberal parties stood 50 and 47 respectively. Other candidates included 3 Independents and 1 Communist. There were 13 three-seat wards, 4 two-seat wards, 2 four-seat wards and 1 single-seat ward.

This election had aldermen as well as directly elected councillors.  Labour got 7 aldermen and the Conservatives 2.

The Council was elected in 1964 as a "shadow authority" but did not start operations until 1 April 1965.

Election result
The results saw Labour gain the new council with a majority of 22 after winning 39 of the 56 seats. Overall turnout in the election was 47.1%. This turnout included 1,126 postal votes.

Ward results

References

1964
1964 London Borough council elections